Elections were held in the organized municipalities in the Nipissing District of Ontario on October 25, 2010 in conjunction with municipal elections across the province.

Bonfield
The election in Bonfield was won by Randall McLaren, a longtime member of the municipal council.

Calvin
Incumbent mayor Wayne Brown was re-elected in Calvin over challenger Rocky Edmonds.

Chisholm
Chisholm was one of a number of municipalities in the region whose mayors were acclaimed to office.

East Ferris
Incumbent mayor Bill Vrebosch was handily re-elected in East Ferris. All four incumbent councillors — Rick Champagne, Dan Corbeil, Terry Kelly and Robert Point — won by acclamation.

Mattawa
Incumbent mayor Dean Backer won re-election in Mattawa.

Mattawan
No elections took place in the township of Mattawan, as the entire council was acclaimed into office.

North Bay

Mayor
Al McDonald, a former city councillor and MPP for the city of North Bay, was elected with nearly 87 per cent of the vote to succeed retiring mayor Vic Fedeli.

City Council
All 10 members of North Bay City Council are elected at-large. As the top finisher in the city council election, Peter Chirico will serve as deputy mayor.

Papineau-Cameron
Papineau-Cameron was one of a number of municipalities in the region whose mayors were acclaimed to office.

South Algonquin
South Algonquin was one of a number of municipalities in the region whose mayors were acclaimed to office.

Temagami
Town clerk John Hodgson won the mayoralty of Temagami, defeating incumbent mayor Ike Laba and two other challengers. Sam Barnes, Lorie Hunter, Paul Middleton, Debby Burrows, Deborah Charyna and John Kenrick will serve on council.

West Nipissing
West Nipissing was one of a number of municipalities in the region whose mayors were acclaimed to office. Denise Brisson, Guilles Tessier, Guy Fortier, Leo Malette, Don Fortin, Jamie Restoule, Paul Finley and Normand Roberge were elected to council.

References

2010 Ontario municipal elections
Nipissing District